Bloomers Hole Footbridge is a footbridge across the River Thames in Oxfordshire, England. It is situated on the reach above Buscot Lock and was installed in 2000 to carry the Thames Path across the Thames. It is built of steel encased in wood to make it look like a timber structure.

The Countryside Agency commissioned Oxfordshire County Council to design and build the bridge and the design was undertaken by Charlie Benner, the senior engineer. The bridge was installed in 2000. The two  8-tonne steel beams were put in place by a Chinook helicopter from RAF Brize Norton.

Bloomer's Hole is at a wide bend about quarter of a mile downstream of St John's Lock. The river winds tortuously along here, and although a cut of the river across Bloomer Meadow was mooted as early as 1802, it was never implemented.

See also
Crossings of the River Thames

References

Pedestrian bridges across the River Thames
Bridges in Oxfordshire
Bridges completed in 2000